Orthocis is a genus of tree-fungus beetles in the family Ciidae.

Species
These 27 species belong to the genus Orthocis:

 Orthocis alni (Gyllenhal, 1813) g
 Orthocis alnoides (Reitter, 1884) g
 Orthocis auriculariae Lawrence, 1991
 Orthocis collenettei (Blair, 1927) g
 Orthocis coluber (Abeille, 1874) g
 Orthocis festivus (Panzer, 1793) g
 Orthocis huesanus Kraus, 1908 i c g
 Orthocis insularis Waterhouse, 1876 g
 Orthocis ishiharai Kawanabe, 1994
 Orthocis juglandis (Reitter, 1885) g
 Orthocis linearis (J.Sahlberg, 1900) g
 Orthocis longulus Dury, 1917 i c g
 Orthocis lucasi (Abeille de Perrin, 1874) g
 Orthocis nigrosplendidus Nobuchi, 1955
 Orthocis ornatus Reitter, 1877
 Orthocis perrisi (Abeille de Perrin, 1874) g
 Orthocis pseudolinearis Lohse, 1965 g
 Orthocis pulcher Kraus, 1908 i c g
 Orthocis punctatus (Mellié, 1848) i c g b
 Orthocis pygmaeus (Marsham, 1802) g
 Orthocis sagittiferus (Israelsson, 1980) g
 Orthocis schizophylli Nakane & Nobuchi, 1955
 Orthocis sublacernatus (Scott, 1926) g
 Orthocis testaceofasciatus (Pic, 1922) g
 Orthocis transversatus (Kraus, 1908) i c g b
 Orthocis vestitus (Mellié, 1848) g
 Orthocis zoufali (Reitter, 1902) g

Data sources: i = ITIS, c = Catalogue of Life, g = GBIF, b = Bugguide.net

References

Ciidae genera